The Men's Pole Vault event at the 2009 World Championships in Berlin, Germany will be held between 20 August and 22 August 2009.

Reigning Olympic champion Steven Hooker came into the competition nursing a pulled hamstring incurred 12 days before the championships.  Minimizing his effort, he only took one (successful) attempt in qualifying and two attempts in the final.  Hooker waited until only three other competitors were left in the field.  Hooker agonized in the pit after missing his attempt at 5.85, then watched Romain Mesnil clear.  After one failure Renaud Lavillenie joined Hooker in passing to the next height while Maksym Mazuryk, who had passed to get to 5.85 exhausted his attempts.  Constantly stretching and massaging his hamstring, Hooker successfully cleared 5.90 with room to spare, leaping from nothing to first place.  Mesnil and Lavillenie could not answer.

Medalists

Records

Qualification standards

Schedule

Results

Qualification
Qualification: Qualifying Performance 5.75 (Q) or at least 12 best performers (q) advance to the final.

Key:  NM = no mark (i.e. no valid result), NR = National record, q = qualification by overall place, SB = Seasonal best

Final

References
General

Specific

Pole vault
Pole vault at the World Athletics Championships